Kalkatungu (also Kalkutungu, Galgadungu, Kalkutung, Kalkadoon, or Galgaduun) is an extinct Australian Aboriginal language formerly spoken around the area of Mount Isa and Cloncurry, Queensland.

Classification
Apart from the closely related language, Wakabunga, Kalkatungu is sometimes grouped with Yalarnnga as the Kalkatungic (Galgadungic) branch of the Pama–Nyungan family. O'Grady et al., however, classify it as the sole member of the "Kalkatungic group" of the Pama-Nyungan family, and Dixon (2002) regards Kalkatungic as an areal group.

Revival
Emeritus Professor Barry Blake, Sheree Blackley and others have revived the language based on recordings, written grammars and personal memories. Robert Ah Wing assisted by Uncle Arthur Peterson is also active in this field. Often, emphasis is placed on belonging, passing on elements of language to younger Kalkatungu.

Phonology

Vowels

Consonants

It is not clear if the vibrant is a trill or a tap.

Stress
Like in English, word stress is realised in terms of loudness. Sentence stress is also organised similar to English with the first syllable in the final word of a phonological phrase getting the main stress.(tonic stress) Moreover, if there are more than two words in a phrase, the first syllable of the first word receives more stress than the non-final words.

Kalkatungu Sign Language
Kendon (1988) shows that Kalkatungu also had a developed signed form of their language.

References

 Roth, Walter E. (1897). The expression of ideas by manual signs: a sign-language. (p. 273–301) Reprinted from Roth, W.E. Ethnological studies among the North-West-Central Queensland Aborigines. London, Queensland Agent-Generals Information Office, 1897; 71–90; Information collected from the following tribes; Pitta-Pitta, Boinji, Ulaolinya, Wonkajera, Walookera, Undekerebina, Kalkadoon, Mitakoodi, Woonamurra, Goa. Reprinted (1978) in Aboriginal sign languages of the Americas and Australia. New York: Plenum Press, vol. 2.

External links 

 Soraya Johnston digital story, State Library of Queensland. Digital story discussing Kalkadoon language

Kalkatungic languages
Extinct languages of Queensland
North West Queensland